Barbarella is a musical based on the 1968 film Barbarella, which in turn was based on a French science fiction comic book created by Jean-Claude Forest. The story is about Barbarella, a young woman who has numerous adventures, often involving sex, while journeying around the galaxy.

The musical was written by British composer Dave Stewart and premiered in Vienna, Austria on 11 March 2004. The title role was played by Nina Proll. The musical closed on 1 January 2005. A cast recording was made, but only 100 copies were pressed for the public. These were distributed by lottery to members of the Vereinigte Bühnen Wien (United Stages of Vienna)'s "Musical Club".

External links 
 Review in Variety
 Interview with Stewart in Financial Times
  Review in Deutsche Welle
  Review in Die Welt
  Review in Netzeitung

Musicals based on films
Musicals based on multiple works
Science fiction musicals
Musicals by David A. Stewart
2004 musicals
Musicals based on comics
Fantasy theatre
Fantasy music